Armin R. Kraeft (November 4, 1909 – November 29, 2000) was an American football, basketball, and baseball coach. He served as the head football coach at the University of Wisconsin–Milwaukee from 1956 to 1959, compiling a record of 9–23.

Kraeft attended Marion High School in Marion, Wisconsin and then La Crosse State Teachers College—now known as the University of Wisconsin–La Crosse, where he played basketball and was a member of the championship team of 1930–31. He coached at Reedsburg High School in Reedsburg, Wisconsin for four years before moving to Portage High School in Portage, Wisconsin in 1935. In 1943, Kraeft was hired at Lima High School in Lima, Ohio.

Kraeft was inducted into the United States Army on December 16, 1943. He initially held the rank of corporal and served with the infantry  at Camp Fannin. He then attended Officer Candidate School at Fort Benning and was commissioned as a second lieutenant. Kraeft was discharged from the military in the spring of 1946 and resumed coaching that fall when he was hired an assistant football coach and physical education instructor at Milwaukee State Teachers College—now known as University of Wisconsin–Milwaukee.

Head coaching record

College football

References

External links
 

1909 births
2000 deaths
Milwaukee Panthers baseball coaches
Milwaukee Panthers football coaches
Wisconsin–La Crosse Eagles men's basketball players
High school basketball coaches in Wisconsin
High school football coaches in Ohio
High school football coaches in Wisconsin
United States Army officers
United States Army personnel of World War II
United States Army soldiers
University of Wisconsin–Milwaukee faculty
People from Marion, Wisconsin
Coaches of American football from Wisconsin
Baseball coaches from Wisconsin
Basketball coaches from Wisconsin
Basketball players from Wisconsin